The 2011 ICC World Cricket League Americas Region Twenty20 Division One is a cricket tournament that took place from 18 to 23 July 2011. The United States of America hosted the event.

Teams
Teams that qualified are as follows:

Squads

Fixtures

Points Table

Matches

Statistics

Highest team totals
The following table lists the six highest team scores.

Most runs
The top five highest run scorers (total runs) are included in this table.

Highest scores
This table contains the top five highest scores made by a batsman in a single innings.

Most wickets
The following table contains the five leading wicket-takers.

Best bowling figures
This table lists the top five players with the best bowling figures.

See also

2012 ICC World Twenty20 Qualifier

References

2012 ICC World Twenty20
ICC World Cricket League Americas Region Twenty20 Division One